Rohatyn is a city located on the Hnyla Lypa River in Ivano-Frankivsk Raion, Ivano-Frankivsk Oblast, in western Ukraine. It hosts the administration of Rohatyn urban hromada, one of the hromadas of Ukraine. Population: .

Prior to World War II the town was located in Poland.

Name
It was first mentioned in historical documents in 1184 as a part of the Kingdom of Galicia–Volhynia. Its name seems to be derived from Ruthenia, the name of the region of the location. However, the town emblem has a horn of a deer which gives the first part of the Slavic name of Rohatyn or Rogatyn – "Rog" ("Horn"). The second part "Tyn" can be connected with a word which means "Stacket". Together these two words give us "Horn Stacket".

Also, there is a legend connected with the image of the deer horn of the town emblem. It is said that a wife of the Duke Jaroslav Osmomysl, being lost in a forest, met a deer. She survived by following the deer out of the forest. A fort was built with name "Rogach" ("Deer") on the place where the duchess supposedly stepped out of the forest.
 
The town name also can be connected with the Slavic word "Rogatyna" which means a heavy spear for martial arts or bear hunting ("Bear Spear"). It was first mentioned in 1149 (Laurentian Chronicle). In Polish heraldry "Rogacina" means "Broadhead".

History
In 1415, under Polish rule, it was granted Magdeburg rights, and subsequently developed into an important trading and manufacturing town. In 1520, the region was attacked by Crimean Tatars, Hürrem Sultan, a native of Rohatyn, was captured there and sold to the Ottoman Sultan Suleiman the Magnificent of which she became his concubine, then his legal wife and haseki sultan. In the 16th century a renowned school of icon painting arose in Rohatyn, and in the 1580s an Orthodox brotherhood was founded obtaining the stauropegion (a monastery exempt from the control of the local bishop) status. After the First Partition of Poland in 1772, Rohatyn was annexed by Austria, and became a county center. A Ukrainian gymnasium was established there in 1909, and a minor theological seminary in 1931. In 1910, half of the town population was Jewish. During the interwar period the town was under Polish rule. In 1939, it became part of Soviet Ukraine and was granted city status. During World War II, 99 percent of the 3,000 strong Jewish population were murdered in The Holocaust.
 
Today it is an important highway junction; 26 percent of its inhabitants work in the transportation industry.

Until 18 July 2020, Rohatyn was the administrative center of Rohatyn Raion. The raion was abolished in July 2020 as part of the administrative reform of Ukraine, which reduced the number of raions of Ivano-Frankivsk Oblast to six. The area of Rohatyn Raion was merged into Ivano-Frankivsk Raion.

Monuments

 stone Church of the Nativity of the Theotokos (end of the 14th century)
 remnants of the town walls and gate from the 13th and 14th centuries
 wooden Church of the Holy Spirit (1644–1645) with a magnificent iconostasis (1647–1650) is on UNESCO world heritage list
 the ruins of the Dominican monastery (1614)
 Roman Catholic Saint Nicholas's Church in the Renaissance style (1666)
 wooden Saint Nicholas's Church (1729).
 Statue of Nastia Lisovska (Hürrem Sultan) (1999) replacement for a statue of Lenin

People
 Hürrem Sultan (Roxelana), consort to Suleiman the Magnificent, first Haseki Sultan of the Ottoman Empire and initiator of the Sultanate of Women
 Lessia Leskiv, a Ukrainian sport shooter
 Ivan Krypiakevych, a Ukrainian historian, academician, professor of Lviv University and director of the Institute of Social Sciences of Ukraine, worked in Rohatyn.

Gallery

Location 
Local orientation

Regional orientation

Notes

References

External links

 Rohatyn in the Encyclopedia of Ukraine
 Website of Rohatyn
 Jewish Rohatyn
 Photographs of Jewish sites in Rohatyn in  Jewish History in Galicia and Bukovina
 Site about Rohatyn with photos and history
 Rohatyn District Research Group
 Rohatyn Jewish Heritage
 Gesher Galicia - A group dedicated to the Jewish genealogy of Galicia and preserving its Jewish culture and heritage

 
Cities in Ivano-Frankivsk Oblast
Stanisławów Voivodeship
Ruthenian Voivodeship
Shtetls
Cities of district significance in Ukraine
Magdeburg rights
Holocaust locations in Ukraine